Tuber brumale, also known as Muscat truffle or winter truffle, is a species of truffle native to Southern Europe. It is naturally present in the soils of many truffle orchards.

References

 

Truffles (fungi)
brumale
Fungi described in 1831